The People's European Union of Bosnia and Herzegovina (abbreviated NES) is a political party in Bosnia and Herzegovina, formed by the merger of the Party of Democratic Activity (A-SDA) and the Independent Bosnian-Herzegovinian List (NBL) on 27 February 2021 in Sarajevo. The president of the now former A-SDA and the new president of the NES is Nermin Ogrešević. The party was announced by the municipal mayor of Stari Grad Sarajevo and former NBL leader, Ibrahim Hadžibajrić, as an "enlargement" of the political scene. The NES is currently part of the government of Una-Sana Canton.

The NES inherited one seat in the House of Representatives of Bosnia and Herzegovina, which the A-SDA won in the 2018 general election.

Elections

Parliamentary elections

References

Bosniak political parties in Bosnia and Herzegovina
Conservative parties in Bosnia and Herzegovina
Political parties established in 2021
Political parties in Bosnia and Herzegovina
Pro-European political parties in Bosnia and Herzegovina